The 1989–90 season was Manchester City's first season back in the top tier of English football, the Football League First Division.

Football League First Division

League table

Results summary

Matches

FA Cup

League Cup

Full Members' Cup

Squad

Left club during season

Notes

References

External links

Manchester City F.C. seasons
Manchester City